Robert Cain may refer to:
Robert Cain (brewer) (1826–1907), founder of Cains Brewery in Liverpool, England
Robert Henry Cain (1909–1974), Victoria Cross recipient
Bob Cain (1924–1997), Major League Baseball pitcher
Bob Cain (footballer) (1866–?), Scottish footballer
Bob Cain (reporter) (1934–2014), American news anchor
a pseudonym used by writer William H. Keith Jr.

See also
Robert Cane (1807–1858), Irish editor
Robert Kane (disambiguation)